Daniel Langleben is a psychiatrist, professor, and scientific researcher. He pioneered a technique for using functional magnetic resonance imaging (fMRI) as a means of lie detection. He has also studied the brain effects of packaging and advertising and how infants' cuteness motivates caretaking in adults.

Biography
He received his Doctor of Medicine degree in 1989 and had his postgraduate training in Psychiatry, Addiction Psychiatry, Radiology and Nuclear Medicine at the Medical College of Pennsylvania, the Mount Sinai Hospital, UCSF and Stanford University Hospital.

fMRI and lie detection

2001 study
Langleben was inspired to test lie detection while he was at Stanford University studying the effects of a drug on children with Attention Deficit Disorder (ADD). He found that these children have a more difficult time inhibiting the truth. He postulated that lying requires increased brain activity compared to truth because the truth must be suppressed, essentially creating more work for the brain. In 2001, he published his first work with lie detection using a modified form of the Guilty Knowledge Test, which is sometimes used in polygraph tests. The subjects, right-handed, male college students, were given a card and a Yes/No handheld clicker. They were told to lie to a computer asking questions while they underwent a brain scan only when the question would reveal their card. The subjects were given $20 for participating, and told they would receive more money if they deceived the computer; however, none did.

His studies showed that the inferior and superior prefrontal and anterior cingulate gyri and the parietal cortex showed increased activity during deception. In 2002, he licensed his methods for lie detection to the No Lie MRI company located in San Diego, California.

Critiques
Critiques of this technique point out that fMRI does not actually measure lying, only the increased brain activity that occurs when one is lying. Using fMRI for lie detection could then lead to false positives produced by anxiety or other causes.

Another concern is that a "lie" is not always clear-cut, and may be a complex concept. More complex types of deception may not be detected by imaging techniques.

References

Selected publications

External links
 UPenn profile, contains various links to relevant media and publications

American psychiatrists
University of Pennsylvania faculty
Living people
Year of birth missing (living people)